Velika Greda is a village in Serbia. It is situated in the Plandište municipality, in the South Banat District, Vojvodina province. The village has a Serb ethnic majority (69,86%) with a present Hungarian (12.29%) and a Macedonian minority (9.89%), and its population as of the 2002 census, was 1,374 people.

Name

In Serbian, the village is known as Velika Greda (Велика Греда), in Hungarian as Györgyháza, and in German as Georgshausen.

Historical population

1961: 1,942
1971: 1,775
1981: 1,585
1991: 1,508
2002: 1,374

References
Slobodan Ćurčić, Broj stanovnika Vojvodine, Novi Sad, 1996.

See also
List of places in Serbia
List of cities, towns and villages in Vojvodina

Populated places in Serbian Banat
Populated places in South Banat District
Plandište